Yllan Okou (born 23 December 2002) is a French professional footballer who plays as a defender for Ligue 1 club Monaco.

Early life 
Born in Poitiers, Yllan Okou is the son of the Ivorian former rugby union player Alfred Okou. He moved to Buxerolles as a 7 year old, whilst starting to play football with the Poitiers. There he was a close friend of Nicolas Tié, who would also end up pursuing a professional career in football at Chelsea and Vitória de Guimaraes.

Club career 
While playing his youth club football at Poitiers, Okou also joined the federal  of Châteauroux in 2015. After this spell in the FFF institution, he entered the Monaco academy in 2017.

Yllan Okou made his professional debut for Monaco on 2 January 2022, starting and playing every minute of a Coupe de France 3–1 away win against Quevilly-Rouen as a center-back.

References

External links
Profile at the AS Monaco FC website

2002 births
Living people
Sportspeople from Poitiers
French footballers
French sportspeople of Ivorian descent
Association football defenders
AS Monaco FC players
Championnat National 2 players
Footballers from Nouvelle-Aquitaine